Greenfields Public School, Dilshad Garden, Delhi, India, run by Greenfields Public School Society, is a co-educational senior secondary school with courses in Science, Commerce and Humanities.  It is affiliated to the CBSE, New Delhi. It  was founded by R. R. Joshi in 1966 at P-11, Navin Shahadara, and has developed into a large institution with nearly 5000 students.

Staff
The Principal and Manager is Dr. S. K. Sharma with a team of over 200 staff.

References

External links
 www.greenfieldspublicschool.com

Educational institutions established in 1966
High schools and secondary schools in Delhi
1966 establishments in Delhi
CBSE Delhi